Chandra Kumar Naranbhai Patel (born 2 July 1938) is an electrical engineer. He developed the carbon dioxide laser in 1963; it is now widely used in industry for cutting and engraving a wide range of materials like plastic and wood. Because the atmosphere is quite transparent to infrared light, CO2 lasers are also used for military rangefinding using LIDAR techniques.

Patel was born in Baramati, India, and received a Bachelor of Engineering (B.E.) degree from the Government College of Engineering, the University of Pune, India and the M.S. and PhD in electrical engineering from Stanford University in 1959 and 1961, respectively. Patel joined Bell Laboratories in 1961, and subsequently became Executive Director of the Research, Materials Science, Engineering and Academic Affairs Division at AT&T Bell Laboratories in Murray Hill, New Jersey, where he developed the carbon dioxide laser. Patel's discovery, in 1963, of the laser action on the rotational–vibrational transitions of carbon dioxide and his discovery, in 1964, of efficient vibrational energy transfer between molecules, led to a series of experiments which demonstrated that the carbon dioxide laser was capable of very high continuous-wave and pulsed power output at very high conversion efficiencies.

From 1993–1999, Patel served as vice chancellor for research at the University of California, Los Angeles, where he is also professor of physics and adjunct professor of electrical engineering.

In 1996, President Bill Clinton awarded Patel the National Medal of Science, "[f]or his fundamental contributions to quantum electronics and invention of the carbon dioxide laser, which have had significant impact on industrial, scientific, medical, and defense applications." In addition to the carbon dioxide laser, he also developed the "spin-flip" infrared Raman laser.

Patel currently holds 36 U.S. patents relating to lasers and laser applications. He is a member of the National Academy of Engineering and the National Academy of Sciences, and a Fellow of the American Academy of Arts and Sciences, the American Association for the Advancement of Science, the American Physical Society, the IEEE, the Optical Society of America, the Laser Institute of America, the American Society of Laser Medicine and a Senior Fellow of the California Council on Science and Technology.

In 2018 C. Kumar N. Patel became an Honorary Member of the American Laser Study Club which a year later named an award in his honor.

Awards and honors
Stuart Ballantine Medal (1968)
Fellow, American Academy of Arts and Sciences (1976)
Member, National Academy of Engineering (1978)
IEEE Medal of Honor (1989)
National Medal of Science (1996)

References

External links
IEEE History Center biography
Frederic Ives Medal by the OSA

1938 births
Living people
American electrical engineers
Indian electrical engineers
Indian emigrants to the United States
Stanford University School of Engineering alumni
Savitribai Phule Pune University alumni
University of California, Los Angeles faculty
Laser researchers
Gujarati people
American Hindus
People from Pune district
National Medal of Science laureates
IEEE Medal of Honor recipients
Members of the United States National Academy of Sciences
Members of the United States National Academy of Engineering
Foreign Fellows of the Indian National Science Academy
Engineers from Maharashtra
20th-century Indian engineers
Indian optical physicists
Engineers from California
IEEE Lamme Medal recipients
Fellow Members of the IEEE
Fellows of the American Academy of Arts and Sciences
Fellows of the American Association for the Advancement of Science
Fellows of the American Physical Society
Fellows of Optica (society)
Presidents of the American Physical Society